Panoli railway station is a railway station on the Western Railway network in the state of Gujarat, India. Panoli railway station is 20 km far away from Bharuch railway station. Passenger, MEMU and few Express trains halt at Panoli railway station.

Nearby Stations 

Hathuran is the nearest railway station towards Mumbai, whereas Ankleshwar is the nearest railway station towards Vadodara.

Major Trains 

Passenger Trains:

 59049/50 Valsad - Viramgam Passenger
 69149/50 Virar - Bharuch MEMU
 59439/40 Mumbai Central - Ahmedabad Passenger
 59441/42 Ahmedabad - Mumbai Central Passenger
 69111/12 Surat - Vadodara MEMU
 69171/72 Surat - Bharuch MEMU
 69109/10 Vadodara - Surat MEMU

Following Express trains halt at Panoli railway station in both directions:

 19033/34 Valsad - Ahmedabad Gujarat Queen Express
 19023/24 Mumbai Central - Firozpur Janata Express
 19215/16 Mumbai Central - Porbandar Saurashtra Express

See also
 Bharuch district

References

Railway stations in Bharuch district
Vadodara railway division